Jim Hautman is an American painter, residing in Minnesota. The artist is best known for his realist wildlife art, particularly the US Federal Duck Stamp.  The artist's paintings have been featured on the 1999, 1995 and 1990 Federal Duck Stamps, a project that raised millions of dollars for environmental conservation. 

His brothers Joe Hautman and Robert Hautman are also wildlife artists.

See also
 Bonnie, Rebecca and Karen Latham

References

External links
 

Year of birth missing (living people)
Living people
Painters from Minnesota
20th-century American painters
American male painters
21st-century American painters
21st-century American male artists
American bird artists
20th-century American male artists